The Bungled & the Botched is the tenth full-length studio album by drone doom band Nadja, released in July 2008 on ConSouling Sounds and limited to 500 copies.

The second track, "Absorbed in You", is a re-recording of the song of the same name from Nadja's collaboration Absorption with Methadrone from 2005. The limited pre-order edition of the album also came with a CD-R containing the demo version of "The Bungled & the Botched" and the original version of "Absorbed in You".

Track list

CD

CD-R

Personnel 
 Aidan Baker - guitar, vocals, flute, piano, drum machine
 Leah Buckareff - bass, vocals

References 

2008 albums
Nadja (band) albums